Christine Paule Pelosi (born May 5, 1966) is an American Democratic Party political strategist from California. She is the daughter of Nancy Pelosi, the former Speaker of the United States House of Representatives, and businessman Paul Pelosi and sister of Alexandra Pelosi.

Early life and education
Christine Pelosi is the daughter of Nancy Pelosi and Paul Pelosi, and was born in California. She has four siblings: Nancy Corinne, Jacqueline, Paul, and Alexandra.

She holds a bachelor's degree from Georgetown University's Edmund A. Walsh School of Foreign Service and a JD from the University of California Hastings College of the Law.

Career
Her work in public policy and politics includes service as executive director (1998–1999), Platform Chair (1995–2008), and Women's Caucus Chair (2011–2021) of the California Democratic Party; Deputy City Attorney (Construction and Trial Teams) and Assistant District Attorney (Sexual Assault and Child Abuse Unit) for the City of San Francisco; U.S. Department of Housing and Urban Development Special Counsel in the Clinton/Gore Administration (1999–2001); and, Chief of Staff to U.S. Representative John F. Tierney (2001–2005). Pelosi has also served as a board member and the Interim Executive Director of the Young Democrats of America (2011).

She is the author of Campaign Boot Camp: Basic Training for Future Leaders (2007) and Campaign Boot Camp 2.0 (2012), books used in her leadership trainings for candidates and causes.

Since January 2007, Pelosi has been writing blog articles on The Huffington Post.

Pelosi has served as volunteer board member for the AIDS Memorial Grove and the New Leaders Council. She has been named a potential successor to her mother's seat in the House by the Los Angeles Times.

She is seen as a successor to her mother given Nancy's immense influence in the San Francisco district.

Democratic National Committee 
Pelosi was elected to the Democratic National Committee, where she cofounded the Veterans and Military Families Council, and as of 2021 is Vice Chair for Campaigns and Elections.

In 2020, Pelosi was one of California's automatic delegates to the Democratic National Convention.

Electoral College member 
Pelosi was a presidential elector for the state of California in the 2016 United States presidential election. Every presidential election year, the 538 members of the Electoral College meet in their state capitals on December 19 to cast the official vote for president. She helped lead the effort to inform the electors and the public about foreign interference in elections.

Personal life 

Pelosi married Peter Kaufman, son of film director Philip Kaufman, on February 16, 2008. They had a daughter in March 2009. Pelosi is a baseball fan, lives within walking distance of the San Francisco Giants' stadium, and serves on the Giants Community Fund board of directors.

On March 22, 2020 Pelosi tweeted "Rand Paul's neighbor was right" in reference to an assault on Senator Rand Paul, and the tweet was removed. Sen. Paul later cited the tweet after Pelosi's father was severely injured by a hammer-wielding assailant.

Works
Christine Pelosi, Campaign Boot Camp (PoliPointPress, 2007). .
Christine Pelosi, Campaign Boot Camp 2.0 (Berrett-Koehler, 2012) |  | 
Christine Pelosi, The Nancy Pelosi Way (Skyhorse, 2019) | ISBN 1510755845 | ISBN 978-1510755840

References

External links

 
 Christine Pelosi weblog at The Huffington Post
 
 Christine Pelosi video interview about Campaign Boot Camp PTV Books, January 25, 2008

California Democrats
Walsh School of Foreign Service alumni
American people of Italian descent
Living people
Pelosi family
Writers from San Francisco
University of California, Hastings College of the Law alumni
1966 births
2016 United States presidential electors